This uniform polyhedron compound is a symmetric arrangement of 4 hexagonal prisms, aligned with the axes of threefold rotational symmetry of an octahedron.

Cartesian coordinates 
Cartesian coordinates for the vertices of this compound are all the permutations of

 (±1, ±(1−), ±(1+))

References 
.

Polyhedral compounds